Draycott, Draycot or Draycote may refer to:

Places in England

 Draycott, Derbyshire
 Draycott, Gloucestershire
 Draycott, Stroud, a location
 Draycot Moor or Draycott Moor, a former civil parish in Berkshire, now in Oxfordshire
 Draycot, Oxfordshire, a hamlet on the River Thame in Tiddington-with-Albury civil parish, Oxfordshire
 Draycott, Shropshire, a location
 Draycott, Somerset
 Draycott Sleights, an SSSI
 Draycott railway station (Somerset), a former station
 Draycott, South Somerset, a hamlet in Limington parish, Somerset
 Draycott in the Clay, Staffordshire
 Draycott in the Moors, Staffordshire
 Draycote, Warwickshire
 Draycote Water
 Draycot Cerne, Wiltshire
 Draycot Foliat, Wiltshire
 Draycott, Worcestershire

People
 Draycott (surname)

See also
 Draycot, Oxfordshire, a hamlet in the parish of Tiddington-with-Albury, Oxfordshire
 Drayton (disambiguation)